Hyde Park Gate is a street in Central London, England, which applies to two parallel roads in Kensington on the southern boundary of Kensington Gardens. These two roads run south, perpendicular to Kensington Road, but the name Hyde Park Gate also applies to the houses on the south side of that road between Queen's Gate and De Vere Gardens. 

It is known for being a former residence and the death place of Sir Winston Churchill.

The numbering system was changed in 1884, e.g. Number 11 became 20.

Notable residents 
Number 6
 The Consular Section of the Embassy of Algeria

Number 9
 Robert Baden-Powell, 1st Baron Baden-Powell, founder of the scouting movement

Number 14
 Margaret Kennedy, novelist

Number 16
 The Embassy of Estonia

Number 17
 Victoria Claflin Woodhull Martin, first woman to run for the US presidency

Number 18
 Sir Jacob Epstein, sculptor and painter

Number 19
 Arthur Stockdale Cope, artist member of the Royal Academy
 
Number 22

 Vanessa Bell, painter
 Virginia Woolf, writer
 Sir Leslie Stephen, scholar and writer (previously at 20, born at 42)
 Julia Stephen, philanthropist, writer, artist's model

Number 24
 Nigel Lawson, Baron Lawson of Blaby, politician and Chancellor of The Exchequer (1983–1989)
 Nigella Lawson, food writer, journalist and broadcaster

Number 28
 Sir Winston Churchill, former prime minister, who died there
 Donatella Flick, socialite, lived there in the 1990s
 The Marquess of Bath acquired the property in 2023

Number 29
 Sir Roderick Jones, director of Reuters, and Enid Bagnold, novelist and playwright

Number 34
 The High Commission of Fiji

Number 38
 The Embassy of the Netherlands

Number 45 (Stoke Lodge)
 Residence of the High Commissioners of Australia, since 1950.

References

Bibliography 

 

Streets in the Royal Borough of Kensington and Chelsea